Tashtego Point is a rocky point marking the east end of the ridge at the south side of Stubb Glacier, on the east coast of Graham Land in Antarctica. Surveyed and photographed by the Falkland Islands Dependencies Survey (FIDS) in 1947. Named by the United Kingdom Antarctic Place-Names Committee (UK-APC) after Tashtego, the Wampanoag harpooner on the Pequod in Herman Melville's Moby-Dick.

Further reading 
 Defense Mapping Agency  1992, Sailing Directions (planning Guide) and (enroute) for Antarctica, P 276

References

External links 
 Tashtego Point on USGS website
 Tashtego Point on AADC website
 Tashtego Point on SCAR website
 Tashtego Point on marineregions.org
 Tashtego Point area map

Headlands of Graham Land
Oscar II Coast
Moby-Dick
Wampanoag
Whaling
Herman Melville
Aquinnah, Massachusetts